Carey Marx (born March 1966) is a British stand up comedian. He has been performing regularly all over the UK comedy circuit for several years, including Komedia, The Comedy Store and Jongleurs. He has had numerous television appearances including Comedy Cuts, BBC Breakfast and Loose Women and has gained international recognition through winning Best International Show at the New Zealand Comedy Festival (2009). He has also had several solo shows to appear at other comedy festivals including Leicester Comedy Festival and the Edinburgh Festival Fringe.

He is represented by Glorious Management.

Solo shows 

Scoundrel (2010),
The Doom Gloom Boom (2009),
Caryness (2008-2009),
Sincerity Aside (2007),
Onomatopoeia Society III (2007),
White Night (2006),
Marry Me (2005)
Albino Hunter (2003).

References

External links 
Glorious Management- Carey's agents
Carey Marx's Chortle Page

Living people
English male comedians
English stand-up comedians
1966 births